Vikram Vedha is a 2017 Indian Tamil-language neo-noir action thriller film directed and written by the husband and wife duo Pushkar–Gayathri and produced by S. Sashikanth under the banner of YNOT Studios. R. Madhavan and Vijay Sethupathi play the title characters Vikram and Vedha respectively. Shraddha Srinath, Kathir and Varalaxmi Sarathkumar play the other lead roles while Prem, Achyuth Kumar, Hareesh Peradi and Vivek Prasanna feature as supporting characters. Sam C. S. composed the film's soundtrack and score. Richard Kevin and P. S. Vinod was in charge of the editing and cinematography respectively.

A contemporary adaptation of the Indian folktale Baital Pachisi, the film follows Vikram, a police inspector who is decisive about good and evil, and the head of an encounter unit which is formed to track down and kill Vedha, a gangster. When the unit makes plans for another encounter, Vedha walks into the police station and voluntarily surrenders himself. He then tells Vikram three stories which bring about a change in the latter's perceptions of right and wrong.

Produced on a budget of ₹110 million (about US$1.7 million in 2017), Vikram Vedha was released on 21 July 2017 and received positive reviews. It was commercially successful, grossing 600 million (about US$9.0 million in 2017) worldwide. The film won 19 awards from 46 nominations; its direction, screenplay, music, and the performances of Madhavan, Sethupathi and Varalaxmi have received the most attention from award groups.

Vikram Vedha received seven nominations at the 65th Filmfare Awards South, including those for Best Film (Sashikanth), Best Actor (Madhavan and Sethupathi) and Best Supporting Actress (Varalaxmi). It won in four categories – Best Director (Pushkar–Gayathri), Best Actor (Sethupathi), Best Male Playback Singer (Anirudh for "Yaanji") and Critics Award for Best Actor – South (Madhavan). At the 10th Vijay Awards, it received fifteen nominations and won four, Best Director, Best Screenplay Writer, Best Actor and Best Background Score. Vikram Vedha received ten nominations at the 7th South Indian International Movie Awards ceremony and won two awards, which were Best Director for Pushkar–Gayathri and Best Actor for Madhavan. Among other wins, the film received four Norway Tamil Film Festival Awards, three Ananda Vikatan Cinema Awards, two Techofes Awards and an Edison Award.

Awards and nominations

See also 
 List of Tamil films of 2017

Notes

References

External links 

 Accolades for Vikram Vedha at the Internet Movie Database

Vikram Vedha